This article lists the ministers of foreign affairs of Uganda since the country gained independence from the United Kingdom on 9 October 1962.

List of ministers

See also
 Ministry of Foreign Affairs (Uganda)
 Foreign relations of Uganda
 List of diplomatic missions of Uganda
 List of Ministers of Internal Affairs of Uganda
 List of Ministers of Justice and Constitutional Affairs of Uganda

References

Bibliography

External links
 Ministry of Foreign Affairs